Union Township is one of twelve townships in Huntington County, Indiana, United States. As of the 2020 census, its population was 1,205.

History
Union Township was originally called Monroe Township, and under the latter name was organized in 1842. It was renamed Union Township in 1845.

The John and Minerva Kline Farm was listed on the National Register of Historic Places in 1988.

Geography

Cities and towns
 Huntington (portion)
 Markle (portion)

Unincorporated towns
 Bowerstown
 Mardenis
 Simpson

Adjacent townships
 Jackson Township (north)
 Lafayette Township, Allen County (northeast)
 Union Township, Wells County (east)
 Rockcreek Township, Wells County (southeast)
 Rock Creek Township (south)
 Lancaster Township (southwest)
 Huntington Township (west)
 Clear Creek Township (northwest)

Cemeteries
Feighner Cemetery is a family cemetery that was founded in 1871 by the Feighner, Haney, Shriner, Plasterer, Smith and Branstator families and is still maintained by the Branstator family today (2019). It contains, as of 2019, 82 individuals. https://lck993.wixsite.com/feighner-cemetery

Major highways
  Interstate 69
  U.S. Route 24
  U.S. Route 224

Demographics

References
 U.S. Board on Geographic Names (GNIS)
 United States Census Bureau cartographic boundary files

External links
 Indiana Township Association
 United Township Association of Indiana

Townships in Huntington County, Indiana
Townships in Indiana